Daniela Mogurean (born 16 July 2001) is a Moldovan Italian group rhythmic gymnast. She is the 2020 Olympic Group All-around bronze medalist, and the 2021 European Group All-around silver medalist.

Career

Junior
She first appeared in Italian National team in 2015, when she was a member of a junior group which competed at the 2015 European Junior Championships and placed 6th in Group All-around and 5th in 5 Balls Final.

Senior
In her first senior year, she joined Italian National reserve group and was part of it till 2021, when she replaced injured Letizia Cicconcelli in main group. She made her senior international debut in May that year, at the 2021 Baku World Cup where her group won silver medal in Group All-around and both Apparatus finals. Then they competed at the 2021 Pesaro World Cup and placed 5th in Group All-around. Next day, they won gold medals in both Apparatus finals. She competed at the 2021 European Championships in Varna, Bulgaria and won silver medal in Group All-around and bronze in 3 Hoops + 4 Clubs final.

Detailed Olympic results

References

External links 
 
 

2001 births
Living people
Moldovan rhythmic gymnasts
Italian rhythmic gymnasts
Italian people of Moldovan descent
Medalists at the Rhythmic Gymnastics European Championships
Medalists at the Rhythmic Gymnastics World Championships
Sportspeople from Chișinău
Gymnasts at the 2020 Summer Olympics
Olympic gymnasts of Italy
Medalists at the 2020 Summer Olympics
Olympic medalists in gymnastics
Olympic bronze medalists for Italy